The South African Republic's postal orders were introduced on 1 January 1898, which was also the date that the South African Postal Union Convention came into effect.

The postal orders are inscribed in Afrikaans.

Issued postal orders do not have counterfoils attached, as the counterfoils were kept by the post office for recording purposes. Any postal orders with counterfoils still attached are from books souvenired after the post office was captured during the Second Boer War.

Denomination Chart

Currency issues (1900)

The South African Republic was the first country, along with the Orange Free State, to declare postal orders to be legal tender as an emergency currency. All denominations, except the 1/6, were allowed to circulate. This was done to save on both paper and labour.

References

 

Currencies of South Africa
South African Republic
Postal system of South Africa
South African Republic
1898 introductions